Derzhiv is a village (selo) in Stryi Raion, Lviv Oblast, of western Ukraine. It belongs to Rozvadiv rural hromada, one of the hromadas of Ukraine. 
The village covers an area of 1,840 km2 and is currently living in the village of about 1204 persons.

Local government is administered by Derzhivska village council.

Geography 

History 
The first written mention of Derzhiv which dates from the year 1550. The finds evidenced that the place of the village there were settlements at the end of the Bronze Age (13th-11th centuries BC. E.). 

Until 18 July 2020, Derzhiv belonged to Mykolaiv Raion. The raion was abolished in July 2020 as part of the administrative reform of Ukraine, which reduced the number of raions of Lviv Oblast to seven. The area of Mykolaiv Raion was merged into Stryi Raion.

References

External links 
 weather.in.ua

Literature 
  Page 471

Villages in Stryi Raion